The Group of Twelve or G12 is a group of industrially advanced countries whose central banks co-operate to regulate international finance.

Note that the G-12 consists of thirteen countries. It encompasses the initial ten members of the International Monetary Fund (IMF), which formed the original G10, adding Australia and Spain. In 1984, when Switzerland joined the G10 and G12, the names of the groups were not changed.

See also 
 Group of Three (G3)
 Group of Four (G4)
 Group of Six (G6)
 Group of Seven (G7)
 Group of Ten (G10)
 G10 currencies
 Special drawing rights

References 

International Monetary Fund
International development
International finance institutions
Intergovernmental organizations
International economic organizations
Economic country classifications
20th-century diplomatic conferences
21st-century diplomatic conferences (Global)
Organizations established in 1962